Princess Charlotte Louise Dorothée de Rohan (25 October 1767 – 1 May 1841) is reputed to have been the secret wife of Louis de Bourbon-Condé, Duc d'Enghien, an important prince du sang and émigré during the French Revolution.

Early life 
Princess Charlotte de Rohan was born in Paris. Her father was Charles Jules, Prince de Rochefort, a member of the House of Rohan, which held princely rank in France prior to the revolution. Her mother was Marie-Henriette d'Orléans-Rothelin, a descendant of Joan of Arc's ally the Bastard of Orléans, whose legitimate heirs, the Dukes of Orléans-Longueville, died out in 1694 leaving only the Rothelin branch, prominent in the kingdom despite a bar sinister.

Marriage 
She is alleged to have privately married the Duc d'Enghien in Baden on 18 February 1804. Before any such marriage was acknowledged publicly, on 21 March 1804 the duke was kidnapped and executed by French troops on the order of Emperor Napoléon, an act which shocked Europe and ultimately extinguished the House of Condé, as he was the only male heir of that cadet branch of the French royal family. Charlotte was never officially recognised as Enghien's widow by the French royal family, neither as émigrés nor during the Bourbon and Orléans restorations, and died in Paris without remarrying at the age of 73.

Relations 
Charlotte was a niece of the Cardinal de Rohan, whose disgrace in the Affair of the Diamond Necklace helped set the stage for the French Revolution by subjecting the royal family and court to notoriety. She was also related to Victoire de Rohan, Duchesse de Montbazon and Governess of the Children of France during the reign of Louis XVI and Marie Antoinette.

Another Charlotte de Rohan was the paternal grandmother of the Duc d'Enghien, who was distantly related to his alleged wife. In fact, they were 5th cousins once removed, both descending from Hercule de Rohan, Duke of Montbazon.

Ancestry

References

1767 births
1841 deaths
Nobility from Paris
Charlotte Louise
Charlotte Louise
18th-century French nobility
19th-century French nobility